Peter Elijah Jonathan Mason is a British politician and town planner who, since May 2021, is the leader of Ealing London Borough Council. He was first elected to Ealing Council in 2014 and was previously Ealing's Cabinet Member for Housing, Planning & Transformation and, from 2013 to 2021, National Secretary of the Jewish Labour Movement. He is the former director of London Jewish Forum. Following a report by former Liberty director Shami Chakrabarti that recommended a transfer of powers to the Labour's National Constitutional Committee (NCC), he was elected to the NCC (which now handles disciplinary cases), the first Jewish Labour Movement candidate to be elected to a national committee in the UK Labour Party for 20 years.

References

External links
Official website
Twitter profile

Year of birth missing (living people)
Living people
20th-century British Jews
21st-century British Jews
Councillors in the London Borough of Ealing
Jewish British politicians
Labour Party (UK) councillors
Leaders of local authorities of England